Cabbage Branch is a  long 1st order tributary to Brown Creek in Anson County, North Carolina.

Course
Cabbage Branch rises in a pond about 0.5 miles west of Ansonville, North Carolina.  Cabbage Branch then flows south-southeast to meet Brown Creek about 3 miles south of Ansonville, North Carolina.

Watershed
Cabbage Branch drains  of area, receives about 47.9 in/year of precipitation, has a topographic wetness index of 445.24 and is about 62% forested.

References

Rivers of North Carolina
Rivers of Anson County, North Carolina
Tributaries of the Pee Dee River